Hopedale Township is located in Tazewell County, Illinois. As of the 2010 census, its population was 1,913 and it contained 806 housing units. Hopedale Township changed its name from Highland Township on May 20, 1850.

Geography

Demographics

References

External links
City-data.com
Illinois State Archives

Townships in Tazewell County, Illinois
Peoria metropolitan area, Illinois
Townships in Illinois